Hospice is a type of care and a philosophy of care that focuses on the palliation of a terminally ill patient's symptoms.

Hospice may also refer to:

Arts, entertainment, and media
 Hospice (Achilles album), 2007
 Hospice (The Antlers album), 2009
 "Hospice", an episode of Aqua Teen Hunger Force

Other uses
 Children's hospice
 Hospice-Anthelme Verreau (1828–1901), French-Canadian priest

See also
 Hostel, short-term dormitory accommodations for travelers
 List of hospice programs